Yung Shue Ha is a village on the south side of Lamma Island, Hong Kong. It is across the bay Shek Pai Wan from the village of Tung O. Both villages are sparsely populated and many places are abandoned.

Administration
Tung O and Yung Shue Ha are recognized village under the New Territories Small House Policy.

Features
A small Hung Shing Temple, built in 1824, is located at the far western end of the beach between Yung Shue Ha and Tung O.

Transportation
Yung Shue Ha can be reached by ferry from Sok Kwu Wan via walking trail. At the north end of Sok Kwu Wan by the Tin Hau Temple is a very steep walking trail that leads to Yung Shue Ha via Tung O. It can also be reached by walking 25 minutes on a relatively flat trail from Mo Tat Wan village. A ferry  service from Aberdeen, in the southern part of Hong Kong island, stops in Mot Tat Wan before going on to Sok Kwu Wan.
In addition, a "sampan" or water taxi service from Aberdeen is available for a price of approximately 180HKD or US$23.40. Due to the currents in the area only a few water taxis will take passengers to the village.

See also
List of buildings, sites, and areas in Hong Kong

References

External links

 Delineation of area of existing village Yung Shue Ha (Lamma South) for election of resident representative (2019 to 2022)
 Delineation of area of existing village Tung O (Lamma South) for election of resident representative (2019 to 2022)
 Antiquities Advisory Board. Pictures of the Hung Shing Temple

Lamma Island
Villages in Islands District, Hong Kong